Amit Dave is a photographer based in Gujarat, India. He has been a part of Reuters' Pulitzer Prize-winning photography team that covered COVID-19 pandemic in India.

Biography
Amit Dave was born in Ahmedabad in Gujarat.
He is a photojournalist working for Reuters.

Career
Amit Dave is a senior photojournalist for Reuters, based in Ahmedabad in India. Before working with Indian Express, he worked as a photographer in state's magazine and a local newspaper in Gujarat. He joined Reuters in 2002. Apart from his work covering COVID-19 pandemic in India for which he won the Pulitzer, Amit also known for capturing events such as the 2001 Gujarat earthquake, 2002 Gujarat riots and 2004 Indian Ocean earthquake and tsunami in South India.

Awards
Amit Dave won the Pulitzer Prize for feature photography in 2022 and shares the award with Reuters photojournalists Adnan Abidi, Sanna Irshad Mattoo, and Danish Siddiqui.

References 

Living people
Pulitzer Prize for Feature Photography winners
Indian photojournalists
Photographers from Gujarat
Reuters people
Year of birth missing (living people)